Mark Anthony Smith (born August 16, 1999) is an American professional basketball player for BG Göttingen of the Basketball Bundesliga. He previously played for the Illinois Fighting Illini, the Missouri Tigers, and the Kansas State Wildcats.

Early life
Smith is the son of Anthony and Yvonne Smith. His father, Anthony, played college basketball at Southern Illinois and SIU Edwardsville and his mother, Yvonne, also played college basketball at SIU Edwardsville. As a child, Smith was a three-sport athlete, competing in baseball, basketball, and football. While in high school, Smith participated in AAU basketball with the Ramey Jets United program through the Adidas circuit.

High school career
As a high school senior, he led Edwardsville to a number one ranking in Illinois for the first time in history while averaging 22 points, eight rebounds, and eight assists, and was named to the first-team Associated Press All-state team. Smith was also selected as the 2017 Illinois Boys Basketball Gatorade Player of the Year and as 2017 Illinois Mr. Basketball.

Recruiting
During his junior year of high school, Smith originally committed to play college baseball for Missouri as a right-handed pitcher. However, in July 2016 Smith decommitted from Missouri given Tim Jamieson's retirement and because of an injury to the flexor pronator tendon in his throwing elbow. Prior to switching his athletic focus to basketball, Smith featured a fastball in the low-90s and was considered a major league baseball prospect out of high school. 

On April 26, 2017, Smith announced he would attend college at the University of Illinois to play for the Fighting Illini under new head coach Brad Underwood. In talking about schools he was considering through the recruitment process, Smith listed Duke and Michigan State as his finalists. Smith also considered scholarship offers from Kentucky and Ohio State.

College career
On March 5, 2018, he announced he would transfer after playing his freshman season at Illinois. On April 14, 2018, Smith announced he would transfer to Missouri. As a senior, he averaged 9.7 points per game while shooting 31.5 percent from three-point range. He moved to Kansas State as a graduate transfer. Smith was named to the Third Team All-Big 12 as well as the All-Newcomer Team.

Professional career
On July 5, 2022, he has signed with BG Göttingen of the Basketball Bundesliga.

Career statistics

College

|-
| style="text-align:left;"| 2017–18
| style="text-align:left;"| Illinois
| 31 || 18 || 19.1 || .337 || .232 || .796 || 1.4 || 1.4 || .6 || .1 || 5.8
|-
| style="text-align:left;"| 2018–19
| style="text-align:left;"| Missouri
| 19 || 16 || 28.4 || .436 || .450 || .774 || 5.2 || 1.6 || .7 || .1 || 11.4
|-
| style="text-align:left;"| 2019–20
| style="text-align:left;"| Missouri
| 24 || 20 || 26.7 || .393 || .371 || .735 || 3.9 || .8 || .9 || .0 || 10.0
|-
| style="text-align:left;"| 2020–21
| style="text-align:left;"| Missouri
| 26 || 24 || 29.6 || .372 || .315 || .765 || 3.2 || 1.0 || 1.0 || .2 || 9.7
|-
| style="text-align:left;"| 2021–22
| style="text-align:left;"| Kansas State
| 31 || 31 || 31.7 || .449 || .362 || .709 || 8.4 || 1.7 || 1.1 || .0 ||  12.7
|- class="sortbottom"
| style="text-align:center;" colspan="2"| Career
| 131 || 111 || 26.9 || .402 || .354 || .745 || 4.4 || 1.3 || .8 || .1 || 9.8

References

External links
Kansas State Wildcats bio
Missouri Tigers bio
Illinois Fighting Illini bio

1999 births
Living people
American men's basketball players
Basketball players from Illinois
BG Göttingen players
Illinois Fighting Illini men's basketball players
Missouri Tigers men's basketball players
People from Edwardsville, Illinois
Shooting guards
Sportspeople from Decatur, Illinois
Sportspeople from Greater St. Louis